Erio or ERIO may refer to:
European Roma Information Office (ERIO), an international advocacy organization for Romani people
Erio Tosatti, an Italian theoretical physicist
Erio Tōwa, a fictional character from Ground Control to Psychoelectric Girl
Erio Mondial, a fictional character from Magical Girl Lyrical Nanoha